or  is a  lake in the municipality of Røyrvik in Trøndelag county, Norway.  The river Namsen used to be the primary outlet, but the lake has been regulated for hydroelectric generation since 1959 and part of the water is diverted south towards a power station.  The lake is fed by three main sources within Børgefjell National Park: the river Storelva which comes from the lake Jengelvatnet, the river Virmaelva, and the river Orelva which comes from the lake Ovrejaevrie.  Namsvatnet has Arctic char, trout, and small carp.  Today, tourism is an important activity.

See also
 List of lakes in Norway

References

Lakes of Trøndelag
Røyrvik